Abronia smithi is a species of lizard in the family Anguidae. Known by the common name Smith's arboreal alligator lizard, the species is endemic to the state of Chiapas in Mexico.

Taxonomy and etymology
A. smithi was described in 1993 by Jonathan A. Campbell and Darrel Frost, and named after the American herpetologist Hobart Muir Smith.

Habitat and geographic range
A. smithi is an arboreal species which lives in the canopies of large trees in the cloud forests of the Sierra Madre de Chiapas.

Reproduction
A. smithi is viviparous.

Conservation status
A. smithi is only known to exist in a few localities in Chiapas. It is uncommon and may be threatened by deforestation, but it occurs in protected habitat, including the El Triunfo Biosphere Reserve.

References

Further reading
Johnson JD, Mata-Silva V, García Padilla E, Wilson LD (2015). "The Herpetofauna of Chiapas, Mexico: composition, distribution, and conservation". Mesoamerican Herpetology 2 (3): 272–329. 
Köhler G (2008). Reptiles of Central America, Second Edition. Offenbach am Main, Germany: Herpeton Verlag. 400 pp. .

Abronia
Endemic reptiles of Mexico
Taxa named by Jonathan A. Campbell
Reptiles described in 1993